Nick Buchert is a professional basketball official who has worked in the National Basketball Association (NBA) since the 2009-2010 season.
He served as a playoff official in 2019 after serving as an alternate official from 2014-2018. He currently wears the uniform number 3.

References

Living people
Year of birth missing (living people)
Sportspeople from Orlando, Florida
National Basketball Association referees
Basketball people from Florida
University High School (Orlando, Florida) alumni